Trafik may refer to:

Traffik (2018 film) written and directed by Deon Taylor
Traffik (miniseries) is a 1989 British TV miniseries.